Diana Ross is the debut studio album by American singer Diana Ross, released on June 19, 1970 by Motown Records. The ultimate test to see if the former Supremes frontwoman could make it as a solo act, the album was overseen by the songwriting-producing team of Nickolas Ashford & Valerie Simpson, who had Ross re-record several of the songs the duo had recorded on other Motown acts. Johnny Bristol, producer of her final single with The Supremes, contributed on The Velvelettes cover "These Things Will Keep Me Loving You."

The album reached number 19 on the US Billboard 200 and peaked at number one on the US Top R&B/Hip-Hop Albums. Diana Ross would later go on to sell 500,000 copies in the United States. Ross' first solo single, "Reach Out and Touch (Somebody's Hand)", sold over 500,000 copies in the US, but was somewhat of a disappointment in terms of chart success, when it charted at number 20 on the Billboard Hot 100. Its follow-up, a cover of Marvin Gaye & Tammi Terrell's "Ain't No Mountain High Enough", peaked at number one on the Hot 100, selling approximately 1,245,000 copies in the US, while garnering a Grammy Award nomination for Best Female Pop Vocal Performance.

The 2002 Expanded Edition re-release of the album featured a number of bonus tracks, including four from her unreleased sessions with 5th Dimension producer Bones Howe. These included two Laura Nyro covers which would subsequently be recorded by Barbra Streisand for her 1971 album Stoney End as well as "Love's Lines, Angles and Rhymes" which become a Fifth Dimension hit in 1971.

Album Cover
The album cover comes from a 1970 photo shoot with photographer Harry Langdon. Hundreds of photos were taken before eventually settling on a look which shunned the glamour Diana was previously known for, a decisive statement marking the turn in her career. Langdon described the look as an attempt to be novel and edgy after seeing so much of the same glamorous aesthetic.

Critical reception

Diana Ross received generally positive reviews from music critics. Ron Wynn of AllMusic, gave the album four and half stars out of five, and stated that the album was the best album she had released while under contract with Motown, and perhaps her best work ever, and that it proved that she would be able to be successful without The Supremes. Village Voice critic Robert Christgau said that while there were two or three good songs, the rest came off bland and boring, also saying that the album did not age well since its release. In a positive review, Daryl Easlea of BBC stated that despite the album cover making it look more bland and uninteresting, that the album and its songs made up for this.

Commercial performance
Diana Ross made its debut on the US Billboard 200 on the chart dated July 11, 1970, debuting at number 71. On the chart issue dated October 3, 1970, it reached its peak at number 19. The album eventually was certified gold by the Recording Industry Association of America (RIAA), denoting shipments of 500,000 copies.

Track listing

Original release

2002 expanded edition

Personnel
Diana Ross – lead vocals (all tracks)
Nickolas Ashford & Valerie Simpson – producers, backing vocals (tracks A1–A3, A5–B6)
Johnny Bristol – producer, additional vocals (on "These Things Will Keep Me Loving You")
Paul Riser – arranger
The Andantes – backing vocals
Jackey Beavers – backing vocals
Maxine & Julia Waters – backing vocals (on "These Things Will Keep Me Loving You")
The Funk Brothers – instrumentation (all tracks)
Technical
Harry Langdon - photography

Charts

Weekly charts

Year-end charts

See also
List of number-one R&B albums of 1970 (U.S.)

References

Diana Ross (album)
Diana Ross (album)
Albums arranged by Paul Riser
Albums produced by Ashford & Simpson
Albums produced by Johnny Bristol
Albums produced by Bones Howe
Motown albums